
Laguna Glaciar (Spanish for "glacial lake") is a lake in the Larecaja Province, La Paz Department, Bolivia.  It located in the Illampu - Janq'u Uma massif. Its surface area is 0.2 km².  At an elevation of 5,038 m, it is the 19th highest lake in the world.

References 

Lakes of La Paz Department (Bolivia)